Point Enragée, also known as Point Rosie, is located northwest of Marystown, Newfoundland and Labrador. All residents were resettled to Garnish, Grand Bank and other Fortune Bay outports during the 1960s.  It never had a road or rail link, and sometimes the Fortune Bay Nor' easters made leaving the community and getting ashore very risky to life and limb. It had a population of 168 in 1956.

In 2008, the little cove is still thriving as a cabin community.  It is at the end of the Garnish - Point Rosie ATV trail (http://www.townofgarnish.com/ATV%20Trail%20Page.htm) and welcomes many hundreds of visitors every year.

See also
 List of communities in Newfoundland and Labrador

References

Ghost towns in Newfoundland and Labrador